Quiet Days in Clichy may refer to:

 Quiet Days in Clichy (novel), by Henry Miller, published in 1956
 Quiet Days in Clichy (1970 film), Danish film based on the novel
 Quiet Days in Clichy (1990 film), French film based on the novel